is a railway station in Nishi-ku, Sapporo, Hokkaidō, Japan, operated by the Hokkaido Railway Company (JR Hokkaido). The station is numbered  S04.

Lines
Hassamu-Chūō Station is served by the Hakodate Main Line.

Station layout
The station consists of two ground-level opposed side platforms serving two tracks, with the station situated above the tracks. The station has automated ticket machines, automated turnstiles which accept Kitaca, and a "Midori no Madoguchi" staffed ticket office.

Platforms

Adjacent stations

Surrounding area
 Subway Hassamu-Minami Station (Tōzai Line)

References

External links
 JR Hokkaido station map

Railway stations in Japan opened in 1986
Railway stations in Sapporo